"Venus in Furs" is a song by the Velvet Underground, written by Lou Reed and originally released on the 1967 album The Velvet Underground & Nico. Inspired by the book of the same name by Leopold von Sacher-Masoch, the song includes sexual themes of sadomasochism, bondage and submission.

"Venus in Furs" was also released as a single on several occasions; in 1988 in the UK and as a live single in France and the UK, in 1993 and 1994 respectively. This live version appears on the 1993 live album Live MCMXCIII.

Recording
"Venus in Furs" was one of three songs to be re-recorded, in May 1966 at TTG Studios in Hollywood, before appearing on the final mix of The Velvet Underground & Nico (the other two being "Heroin" and "I'm Waiting for the Man"). The arrangement features John Cale's cacophonous electric viola as well as Lou Reed's guitar tuned to D G C F A C. Guitarist Sterling Morrison played bass on the song, but according to Cale, who was the band's usual bassist, Morrison never cared for playing the instrument. The backbeat consists of two bass drum beats and one tambourine shake, played at a slow pace by Maureen Tucker.

In his essay "Venus in Furs by the Velvet Underground", Erich Kuersten writes:
"There is no intro or buildup to the song; the track starts as if you opened a door to a decadent Marrakesh S&M/opium den, a blast of air-conditioned Middle Eastern menace with a plodding beat that's the missing link between "Bolero" and Led Zeppelin's version of "When the Levee Breaks".

Morrison always cited "Venus in Furs" as his favourite Velvet Underground song, as he believed that the band had achieved the sound that they had intended.

Personnel
 Lou Reed – lead vocals, lead guitar, ostrich guitar
 John Cale – electric viola
 Sterling Morrison – bass
 Maureen Tucker – tambourine, bass drum

Alternate versions

Ludlow Street Loft, July 1965
The song was one of several early songs to be recorded by Lou Reed, John Cale and Sterling Morrison in their Ludlow Street loft during July 1965. This version of the song features a drastically different arrangement than would appear on The Velvet Underground & Nico, and ends with what David Fricke calls a "stark, Olde English-style folk lament" in the liner notes for Peel Slowly and See (the 1995 compilation album upon which the Ludlow demos appear). John Cale provides lead vocals for this demo recording of the song.

Scepter Studios, April 1966
An alternate take of the song was first recorded at Scepter Studios, New York City before being re-recorded in Hollywood. This take of the song is performed at a quicker pace and the lyrics vary slightly from the TTG recording.

Live recordings
Live recordings of "Venus in Furs" appear on Bootleg Series Volume 1: The Quine Tapes (recorded in San Francisco, December 1969) and on Live MCMXCIII (recorded in Paris, June 1993).

Norman Dolph acetate and Factory rehearsal
The 2012 deluxe six-CD boxed set, celebrating the album's 45th anniversary features, as Disc 4, the original version of the album, cut to acetate on April 26, 1966, known as the "Norman Dolph acetate". This features a version with more of Cale's viola in the arrangement. Additionally, on the same disc, there is a "fun version" recorded on January 3, 1966, during rehearsals at Warhol's Factory.

Legacy
"Venus in Furs" is widely considered one of the band's greatest songs. In 2012, Paste ranked the song number nine on their list of the 20 greatest Velvet Underground songs, and in 2021, The Guardian placed the song at number three on their list of the 30 greatest Velvet Underground songs.

In film and TV
In 1965, the Velvet Underground appeared in Piero Heliczer's underground film, Venus in Furs, which was named for the song. Heliczer, the Velvets, and the other performers were featured in a CBS News segment titled "The Making of an Underground Film" which aired in December of that year. This brief appearance turned out to be the only network television exposure for either Heliczer or the band. 

A version of the song is performed by the fictional band Nürnberg 47, played by the real Swedish band Reeperbahn, in the 1983 film G (also known as G som i gemenskap)

The song is featured in Gus Van Sant's 2005 film Last Days, a fictionalized account of the last days of a musician, loosely based on Kurt Cobain.

In the British TV series Being Human, the song is used prominently in season 2, episode 5.

A version of the song was specially recorded by Julian Casablancas for the HBO television series Vinyl. It appeared on the soundtrack of the second episode during a flashback to Andy Warhol's Factory, alongside "Run Run Run".

The song is featured in season 2, episode 2 of the series POSE as the character Elektra enters the Hellfire Club for a dominatrix session.

Pat Robitaille's cover of the song was featured in season 1, episode 1 of the Netflix series You.

In advertising
In 1993, the song was used as the soundtrack for a British advertisement for Dunlop Tyres, by the advertising agency Abbott Mead Vickers BBDO and directed by British director Tony Kaye. The advertisement was notable for featuring both fetish and surrealist imagery.

References

The Velvet Underground songs
Songs written by Lou Reed
1966 songs
Psychedelic songs
Songs about BDSM
Live singles
Music based on novels
Monster Magnet songs